The Miss Belgium 2009 was held on December 23, 2008 in the Spiroudome, Charleroi, Belgium. There were 20 contestants representing provinces and municipalities of Belgium. The winner, Zeynep Sever, entered Miss Universe 2009 and Miss World 2009. The first runner up entered Miss International 2009. The third runner entered Miss Tourism Queen International 2009 and the fourth runner up entered Miss Intercontinental 2009.

Results

Special Awards

Miss Photogenic - Cassandra d’Ermillio (Hainaut)
Miss Congeniality (voted by contestants) - Hind Ibn-Daifa (Leuven)
Miss Internet (voted through http://www.missbelgie.be/) - Charlotte Withofs (Walloon Brabant)

Candidates

External links
Official website

2009
2009 in Belgium
2009 beauty pageants